National Highway 119 (NH 119) is a  National Highway in India. It runs entirely in the state of Bihar. It is a spur road of National Highway 19. NH-119 was previously numbered NH-2C. This highway mostly runs along Son river.

Route
NH-19 Dehri, Akbarpur(Nagar Panchayat Rohtas), Yadunathpur - Bihar/UP Border(Jaradag).

Junctions  

  Terminal near Dehri

See also 
 List of National Highways in India
 List of National Highways in India by state

References

External links 

 NH 119 on OpenStreetMap

National highways in India
National Highways in Bihar